The 2019 European Table Tennis Championships were held in Nantes, France from 3–8 September 2019. The venue for the competition was Salle Sportive Métropolitaine. The competition featured team events for men and women, with the winning teams qualifying for the 2019 ITTF Team World Cup.

Schedule
Two team events were contested.

Medalists

See also
2019 Europe Top 16 Cup
2019 ITTF World Tour
2019 ITTF World Tour Grand Finals

References

External links
Official website
ITTF website
ETTU website 

 
European Table Tennis Championships
European Table Tennis Championships
European Table Tennis Championships
International sports competitions hosted by France
Table tennis competitions in France
European Table Tennis
Sport in Nantes